Tom "Hollywood" Marechek (born August 25, 1968 in Victoria, British Columbia) is a retired professional lacrosse player.

College career
Marechek played college lacrosse at Syracuse University where he teamed with Paul and Gary Gait to form one of the great college lacrosse squads in history, winning national title games in 1989 and 1990. Marechek is the fifth leading college goal scorers in lacrosse history with 182 goals, a four-time All-American, three-time first-team All-American pick, had 76 assists and 258 career points, scored 53 goals during his junior season to lead NCAA Division I, and set a Syracuse freshman record by scoring 46 goals on just 82 shots (56.1 per cent). He is well known for scoring shots behind his back. He was inducted into both the NCAA Hall of Fame and the US Lacrosse Hall of Fame in 2008.

Professional career

NLL
He also played indoor lacrosse in the National Lacrosse League, where he played 12 seasons with the Philadelphia Wings. He retired from the NLL after the 2005 season. His number 42 was retired by the Wings and now hangs from the rafters at the Wells Fargo Center. Marechek was inducted into the National Lacrosse League Hall of Fame in 2007 and the Canadian Lacrosse Hall of Fame in 2012.

Post-professional career
He formerly coached the Friends School of Baltimore's Men's Lacrosse team in Baltimore, Maryland and was the schools Physical Education Teacher. Tom founded and coaches for the Team 42 Lacrosse Club.  He is also director of All Pro Lacrosse Club with camps held in Florida, Texas, Kansas, Pennsylvania and his flagship camp held at Notre Dame of Maryland University.

Statistics

Syracuse University

(a) 10th in NCAA Men's Division I all-time Total Goals
__

NLL

__

MLL

Awards

See also
NCAA Men's Division I Lacrosse Records
Syracuse Orange men's lacrosse

References

External links
Syracuse Men's Lacrosse 1990 Statistics
Syracuse Men's Lacrosse 1989 Statistics

1968 births
Canadian lacrosse players
Living people
Major League Lacrosse players
National Lacrosse League All-Stars
National Lacrosse League major award winners
Philadelphia Wings players
Sportspeople from Victoria, British Columbia
Syracuse Orange men's lacrosse players